Fauna of Luxembourg may refer to:
 List of birds of Luxembourg
 List of Lepidoptera of Luxembourg
 List of mammals of Luxembourg

See also
 Outline of Luxembourg